Hertia may refer to:

Hertia (plant), a genus of plants in the family Asteraceae
Hertia, a character in Sonic X